The Delphic Club is an all-male social group at Harvard University founded in 1846. It began the process of merging with the all-female Bee Club in August 2017, and the Delphic & Bee became one of fifteen Harvard-recognized social organizations in September 2018. Subsequently, the two clubs reached an agreement to separate in September 2020.

History
The club was founded in 1846 as an all-male chapter of the Delta Phi fraternity, known as the "Alpha of Massachusetts." Twenty members were elected during the Chapter's two years of life. Then faculty forced it to disband. In 1885, the Grand Council of the Delta Phi fraternity decided to re-establish a fraternity at Harvard known as the Zeta Chapter, which evolved into the current club. The membership voted to become a Final Club in 1900 and in 1902 severed ties with the national fraternity to which it had maintained only loose ties. A famous, possibly apocryphal, story has it that J.P. Morgan, Jr., class of 1889, joined The Gas when he didn't get into his club of choice. According to The Harvard Crimson, he then financed the creation of his own club, the Delphic, from the fraternity.

The club was initially located at 52 and 59 Brattle St. before moving to 72 Mt. Auburn St. where it was housed from 1887 to 1903. In the 1890s it "was officially called the Delta Phi, or more familiarly "The Gashouse", because all its windows would be lighted at once by the electricity that was then a novelty; so that it was called "The Gashouse" because of the absence of gas." The current home of the club is at 9 Linden St., steps from Harvard Yard and a few blocks from Harvard Square. It was designed by James Purdon H'1895 in the neo-Georgian style and occupied in 1902-03. The design features the red brick and cornices typical of Harvard Yard. The interior contains numerous large common spaces and an oversize formal dining room on the 2nd floor for large events, no living quarters, and a regulation squash court. In the basement is a panelled living room for entertaining visitors. In August 2017, the Bee Club moved into the house at 9 Linden St. as well.

The Delphic is officially recognized by Harvard University. However, it was not officially affiliated with the university or recognized between 1984 and 2018. Ties with Harvard were severed in 1984 as a consequence of the Title IX provision of the U.S. Education Amendments of 1972, which would have required the club to admit female members. In September 2018, Harvard announced that it would recognize the Delphic-Bee Merged Group as a gender-inclusive club, thereby exempting the club from the college's sanctions on members of single-gender social organizations. The Delphic is governed by a Trust with a Board of Directors composed of alumni.

Merger with The Bee 
In August 2017 the Delphic and the all-female Bee Club agreed to share premises as a precursor to an eventual merger. In September 2018, Harvard College announced that it would recognize the Delphic-Bee Merged Group as a single gender-inclusive social organization. As a result, members of the Delphic & Bee are not subject to the College's sanctions policy. The Bee Club was Harvard's oldest all-female final club, founded in 1991. Subsequently, the two clubs reached an agreement to separate in September 2020.

Name 
The Gashouse was the first name chosen by the founders: Ward Thoron, Herbert Lyman and Boylston Beal in 1885 the club name was chosen the Gashouse because of the absence of gas.The club was founded as the Zeta Chapter of the Delta Phi fraternity. With the opening of the new clubhouse in 1903, after the break from Delta Phi, the undergraduates began calling the club "The Gas," after the club's nickname. This was adopted as the official name in 1908 but soon thereafter was changed to "The Delphic Club", presumably after cooler heads prevailed. The name of the club is a portmanteau of "Delta Phi Club".

Insignia and emblems 
The club's emblem is three torches on a blue field. The slogan for the club is "Three times three, long life to thee." The club's tie(s) consist of the "Three Torches" logo on a dark navy field, while the club's "summer" tie is blue and white stripes on the diagonal. The club's traditions include formal, black tie dinners with alumni and undergraduates and a ban on non-members in the club. The club recruits members through a series of invited dinners and formal dances in a process known as "Punching".

Notable alumni 

 Matt Damon, American actor, screenwriter and film producer.
 Jack Lemmon, American actor.
 J. P. Morgan Jr., American banker, finance executive, and philanthropist.
 Aga Khan IV, 49th and current Imam of Nizari Ismailism.
 Michel de Carvalho, British financier, former Olympic skier and luger, and former child actor in films such as The Brave One, The Tin Star, and Lawrence of Arabia.
 George Santayana, Spanish-American philosopher, essayist, poet, and novelist
 Archibald Cox, U.S. Solicitor General under President John F. Kennedy and a special prosecutor during the Watergate scandal.
 Nicholas Abruzzese, American professional Ice Hockey Center for the Toronto Maple Leafs.

Renovations 
The clubhouse was renovated in 1974-75, which included the walls, interiors and roofs to deal with leaks and general conditions. A more comprehensive renovation was undertaken in 2013-14, it included updating the club's plumbing and electrical systems and also revealed pooled water beneath the club's floor and back yard occasioned by the destruction of the club's drainage system during the construction of Farkas Hall (aka the Hasty Pudding Clubhouse). This has resulted in litigation between the Delphic Club and Harvard University. During renovations of the 2.5 floor, Ronny Yero found paintings dating from the 12th century.

In literature 
Stories of The Gas House are recounted by several authors including Delphic alum Charles Macomb Flandrau who tells many stories in his celebrated book Harvard Episodes and also in Diary of A Freshman (1901). In Harvard Episodes Flandrau (writing in 1897) depicts the multi-generational aspects of the club in describing an old graduate, "If they didn't actually know him, they knew of him. Even this crust is sweet to the returned graduate whose age is just far enough removed from either end of life's measure to make it intrinsically unimportant."
George de la Ruiz Santayana (1886) was made an honorary member in 1890 and spent a great deal of time at the Delphic as recounted in Joel Porte's (Ph.D.'62) book, Santayana at the 'Gas (1964). Santayana included the club in several works, including "The Judgement of Paris, or, How the First-ten Man Chooses a Club," which concludes with:

Whatever follows: nor, until he die
Will Paris grieve he chose the Delta Phi

At the opening of the new clubhouse in 1903, Santayana wrote a dedicatory poem that ends:

And though we go, for change is Nature's plan,
To loves and labours that approve the man,
Half the soul clutches what the world can give,

And half remains where youth and friendship live.

Footnotes 

Collegiate secret societies
Student societies in the United States
Harvard University
Clubs and societies in the United States
1900 establishments in Massachusetts
Buildings and structures in Cambridge, Massachusetts
Harvard Square
Student organizations established in 1900
National Register of Historic Places in Cambridge, Massachusetts
Historic district contributing properties in Massachusetts
Clubhouses on the National Register of Historic Places in Massachusetts